Huddersfield Town's 1934–35 campaign was a season of despair for Town. After the previous season's 2nd-place finish, some fans were even thinking that Town could deny Arsenal their chance to emulate their own successes in the mid-1920s of winning 3 titles in a row. Instead, a dreadful season saw Town finish in 16th place, only 5 points off the relegation zone.

Squad at the start of the season

Review
After the impressive 2nd-place finish the previous season, some fans were even thinking that Town were in a possible title fight with Arsenal, who were on course for a 3rd successive title, matching Town's achievement 8 years earlier. Unfortunately, their first 8 games resulted in only 1 win, which at the time was Town's worst ever start to a season. Later in the season big drubbings including an 8-0 win over Liverpool and a 6-0 win over Blackburn Rovers, which included Alf Lythgoe scoring 5 of the goals, although a 5-0 loss to Portsmouth and a 5-1 home loss to Grimsby Town didn't help Town's goal average. They finished in 16th place, only 5 points clear of Leicester City, who were relegated with Tottenham Hotspur.

Squad at the end of the season

Results

Division One

FA Cup

Appearances and goals

Huddersfield Town A.F.C. seasons
Huddersfield Town F.C.